The Coliseo Mariscal Cáceres is a multi-purpose indoor arena situated in the Chorrillos District of Lima, Peru. It has a capacity for 7000 people. While volleyball is the principal sport played at the facility, it also hosts karate and tae kwon do events, as well as serving as a convention center. The arena is owned by the Peruvian Army.

See also
Coliseo Eduardo Dibos

Sports venues in Lima
Indoor arenas in Peru
Venues of the 2019 Pan and Parapan American Games